Holt Bradford Westerfield (March 7, 1928 – January 19, 2008) was a Damon Wells Professor of International Studies and professor of political science at Yale University.

Biography
He was educated at The Choate School (now Choate Rosemary Hall), Yale, where he was president of the Yale Political Union, and Harvard, where he earned his graduate degrees and taught from 1952 to 1956. After a year at the University of Chicago he joined the Yale faculty in 1957, and remained there for 40 years. Westerfield was a legendary teacher at Yale, where one of his popular courses was nicknamed by students "Lies and Spies." In 1993 he received the inaugural Byrnes-Sewall Award for undergraduate teaching, and in 2003 he received the Phi Beta Kappa Devane Medal. Among his students were George W. Bush, Dick Cheney, and several future senators.

In 1953, as one of the first in Congressional Fellowship Program of the American Political Science Association (APSA), Westerfield worked in the office of Congressman Lawrence Brooks Hays (D-Arkansas) of the House Foreign Affairs Committee.

In 1970, Westerfield was elected as chair of the Political Science Department. At this point in his development, he was a self-styled "hawk" in terms of the ongoing Vietnam War; but he considered himself a moderate consensus builder in matters relating to the Yale faculty and his own department. Westerfield considered Yale a comparatively quiet place compared with the tensions which were wrenching apart other faculties in the leading American universities of that period; and his strategy for building consensus encompassed an emphasis on scholarship, academic competition, and professional prestige of the department.

Influential teacher
Westerfield was credited by Vice President Dick Cheney with having helped shape Cheney's views on foreign policy during Cheney's days at Yale. Cheney's political views were informed by a course he took from Westerfield, then a self-described ardent hawk who believed the United States should be assertive in its role as the leader of the free world. However, Westerfield's views were modified over the course of time, and he came to characterize the Bush administration's foreign policy as "precisely the wrong approach."

Westerfield's legacy as a teacher was more subtly confirmed in a Yale course description prepared for the Spring 2009 semester. Yale's Political Science department offered a seminar on American foreign policy modeled on Westerfield's graduate course.

Publications
 1955 -- Foreign Policy and Party Politics: Pearl Harbor to Korea. New Haven: Yale University Press.
 1963 -- The Instruments of America’s Foreign Policy, Boston: Crowell Press.
 1972 -- The Poverty of Theory and Other Essays, Princeton.
 1975 -- What Use Are Three Versions of the Pentagon Papers?, American Political Science Review, Vol. 69(2), pp. 685–96.
 1981 -- English Prisons and Local Government, Cambridge: Harvard University Press.
 1995 -- Inside the CIA’s Private World: Declassified Articles from the Agency’s Internal Journal, 1955-92. New Haven: Yale University Press.

Honors and awards
 1953—Congressional Fellowship Program of the American Political Science Association (APSA).
 2003 -- William Clyde DeVane Medal, Phi Beta Kappa, Yale University Chapter.

Notes

References
 Carney, James, Perry Bacon Jr., John F. Dickerson, Michael Duffy, Eric Roston, Mark Thompson, Karen Tumulty, Douglas Waller and Sally B. Donnelly.   "7 Clues To Understanding Dick Cheney," Time. December 30, 2002.
 Cikins, Warren I. (2005).  In Search of Middle Ground: Memoirs of a Washington Insider.
New York: Devora Publishing. ; 
  Mansfield, Edward D. and Richard Sisson.  (2004).  The Evolution of Political Knowledge: Theory and inquiry in American politics. Columbus: Ohio State University Press. ; 
 Merelman, Richard M. (2003).  Pluralism at Yale: the culture of political science in America.  Madison: University of Wisconsin Press. 
 Nichols, John.  "A Little Education Can Be a Dangerous Thing," The Nation. August 26, 2004.
 Reinstein, Gila.  Press Release: "In Memoriam: Yale Professor, H. Bradford Westerfield." New Haven: Yale University Office of Public Affairs. January 23, 2008.
 Biggs, Jeffrey.  "Professor Emeritus of Political Science at Yale and APSA Congressional Fellow in Inaugural 1953–54 Class, H. Bradford Westerfield Dies at 79," PS: Political Science & Politics.  (2008), 41: 426-426. Cambridge University Press.

External links
Bradford Westerfield at Yale.edu
 NY Times: "H. Bradford Westerfield, Influential Yale Professor, Is Dead at 79", January 27, 2008

1928 births
2008 deaths
Choate Rosemary Hall alumni
Yale University alumni
Harvard University alumni
Yale University faculty